Juri Zanotti (born 5 January 1999) is an Italian cross-country mountain biker.

Major results

2016
 3rd Cross-country, National Junior Championships
2017
 1st  Cross-country, National Junior Championships
 3rd  Team relay, UEC European Championships
2018
 1st  Cross-country, National Under-23 Championships
 1st  Team relay, UEC European Championships
2020
 UEC European Championships
1st  Team relay
3rd  Under-23 Cross-country
 2nd  Team relay, UCI World Championships
2021
 UEC European Championships
1st  Team relay
2nd  Under-23 Cross-country
 1st  Cross-country, National Under-23 Championships
 UCI Under-23 XCO World Cup
2nd Lenzerheide
3rd Les Gets
2022
 2nd Cross-country, National Championships

References

References
 

1999 births
Living people
Italian male cyclists
Sportspeople from Lecce
Cross-country mountain bikers
21st-century Italian people